Hai Lam, better known as Hai, is an American former professional League of Legends player. He previously played mid lane for the Golden Guardians of the North American League of Legends Championship Series (NA LCS). Hai rose to prominence as the mid laner for Cloud9 (C9), leading them to two NA LCS championships. During a brief retirement due to health issues in 2015, Hai functioned as the Chief Gaming Officer (CGO) of Cloud9. Hai returned to the lineup of Cloud9 as their jungler and support to fill in for the split playoffs. He later became the mid laner for Cloud9 Challenger, which qualified for the LCS and was bought and rebranded as FlyQuest. Hai has won two NA LCS splits with Cloud9, as well as the NA LCS Promotion Tournament with Cloud9 Challenger. He is well known for his shot calling within the game.

Hai announced his retirement from the competitive League of Legends on April 23, 2018. In Spring 2019, he was part of the North America LCS analyst desk.

Early life 

Hai Lam moved to East Lansing, Michigan to attend Michigan State University, where he graduated with a Bachelor of Arts degree in Media Arts and Technology. He was a prominent member of the League of Legends club on campus.

Career

Orbit Gaming 
Hai began his professional League of Legends career in earnest as a part of Orbit Gaming in 2012.

Orbit went on and was placed 7th/8th at the 2012 MLG Spring Championship. At the Spring Championship, Orbit defeated vVv Gaming 2–0 in the first round but lost 1–2 to Counter Logic Gaming Prime in the second round which placed them in the losers bracket. In the losers bracket, Orbit defeated Redact 2–0, Team Legion 2–0, and Team SoloMid Evo 2–0. They eventually lost to Counter Logic Gaming EU 1–2 in the fifth round of the losers bracket.

On June 30, 2012, Orbit Gaming competed in the Leaguepedia North American Invitational. In the two-day online tournament, they were able to finish in first place, most notably defeating Curse Gaming 2–1 in the quarterfinals and sweeping Team Dynamic 2–0 in the finals. On August 26, Orbit took fourth place at the 2012 MLG Summer Championship, losing to Dynamic 1–2 in the third-place match. This led to a tie with Monomaniac Ferus for eighth place in the North American Season Two Circuit Rankings. To decide the last spot for Season Two Regional Finals Seattle, a best-of-three tiebreak match was held. Orbit lost 0–2 to mMe and was denied a spot at the North American Regionals.

Cloud9

2013 season 
Competing under the name Team NomNom and then Cloud9, Nientonsoh, Hai, Yazuki, WildTurtle, and LemonNation would secure a spot in the Season 3 North American Offline Qualifier for the inaugural split of the League of Legends Championship Series. However, Cloud9 would be knocked out of the tournament in the group stage after losing to Team MRN and Azure Gaming.

Initially, Nientonsoh said that Cloud9 would disband in light of the loss. The team later decided to stay together, although Nientonsoh and Yazuki would leave the team and a massive roster swap would ensue. Hai shifted from jungle to mid, and new junglers and top laners were actively being tried out in online competitions. With their final roster of Balls, Meteos, Hai, Sneaky, and LemonNation finally being set, the team set out to qualify for the NA LCS.

2014 season 
Hai was hospitalized after suffering a collapsed lung in June, which prevented him from attending All-Star 2014 in Paris. CLG's Link replaced him on the roster. C9 finished 1st in the 2014 Summer LCS.

2015 season 
Cloud9 finished second in the 2015 NA Spring LCS. In the playoffs, C9 reached the finals, where they were beaten by Team SoloMid. On April 22, 2015, Cloud9 Manager and Founder Jack Etienne posted on the Cloud9 website that Hai was retiring from competitive League of Legends and leaving the team. This followed a post on the League of Legends subreddit that showed Charlie, the coach of Cloud9, chatting with a streamer on how Hai had left the house. Hai mainly blamed his wrist injury in his retirement, saying "My wrist injury is something that I simply cannot ignore. It limits my ability to play as much as I need to and my ability to improve. I cannot keep up with the amount of Solo Queue games my teammates play and it’s not fair to them. At best, my wrist injury would have only allowed me to play for another split and that wasn’t even certain."(Hai Lam) Hai also stated that the team morale was at an all-time low and that his teammates began to lose trust not only in his shot calling, but his performance as a player. Hai announced that he is now a Chief Gaming Officer of Cloud9. He was replaced on the roster by Nicolaj "Incarnation" Jensen. Hai became a temporary substitute for Cloud9 Tempest in June.

Hai came out of retirement in the middle of the Summer 2015 Split and replaced Meteos as Jungler. Hai helped the team rebound safe from relegations but failing to qualify for the playoffs as the team ended the split in 7th place, but due to outstanding championship points from Spring, Cloud9 qualified for the Regional Finals. He helped the team qualify for the 2015 League of Legends World Championship by winning the North American qualifying tournament.

Considered an underdog at Worlds, Cloud9 was placed into Group B along with Fnatic, ahq, and Invictus Gaming and expected to place last. Instead, they surprised with an undefeated 3-0 the first week. In the second week, Cloud9 needed only one win to advance to the quarterfinals but instead lost four games in a row including a tiebreaker loss to ahq. They placed third in their group, ahead of only Invictus Gaming. On the final day of Group Stages, Hai made an obscene gesture towards an opponent who predicted Hai's team would lose. As a result, Hai was fined €500 as he was expected to behave professionally.

2016 season 
In the 2016 Spring Split, Hai was replaced in the jungle by former Team Impulse jungler Yoon-Jae "Rush" Lee, and shared the role of support with former Gravity support Michael "BunnyFuFuu" Kurlyo. Hai trained BunnyFuFuu to become Cloud9's main shotcaller during the spring split.

Cloud9 Challenger 
For the 2016 Summer Split, Hai moved to Cloud9's North America League of Legends Challenger Series (NA CS) team. Cloud9 Challenger made it past the NA CS promotion tournament to clinch a spot for the 2017 LCS Spring Split, although Cloud9 had to sell the spot, as one organization could not have more than one team in the league.

FlyQuest 
Before the start of the 2017 LCS season, the Cloud 9 Challenger roster, including Hai in the mid lane, was purchased by Wesley Edens and rebranded as FlyQuest.

Golden Guardians 
Hai signed with the Golden Guardians in ahead of the 2018 LCS season. In April 2018, Hai announced his retirement.

Tournament results 

 9–11th — 2015 League of Legends World Championship
 3rd — 2016 NA LCS Summer regular season
 1st — 2016 NA Challenger Series Summer playoffs
 2nd — 2016 NA LCS Summer playoffs

Notes

References

External links 
 

Living people
People from Grandville, Michigan
Place of birth missing (living people)
Michigan State University alumni
Cloud9 (esports) players
American esports players
League of Legends jungle players
League of Legends support players
Team Curse players
Golden Guardians players
Twitch (service) streamers
Year of birth missing (living people)